Christopher Peña may refer to:

 Christopher Martin Peña (born 1986), Mexican American boxer 
 Christopher Oscar Peña, playwright, screenwright, actor and educator